W25 or W.25 may refer to :
 W25 (nuclear warhead)
 Hansa-Brandenburg W.25, a Hansa-Brandenburg aircraft
 Mercedes-Benz W25, a racing car
 The W25, a group of women's basketball players selected in 2021 as the 25 top WNBA players of all time
 Watkins 25, an American sailboat design